Rosalie Mae Craig (born 30 May 1981) is an English actress, noted for her performances in musical theatre. In 2013 she received her first major award, a London Evening Standard Award for Best Performance in a Musical.

Life and career
Craig grew up in Nottingham, and studied for a BA in Actor Musicianship at Rose Bruford College, from which she graduated in 2001. After graduation she joined the Royal Shakespeare Company and made her professional stage debut in an adaptation by Adrian Mitchell of Alice in Wonderland.

In 2007 she had her first leading role in a West End production, playing the character Arwen in the musical stage adaptation of The Lord of the Rings.

Since then her notable roles in theatre have included the title character in Tori Amos's The Light Princess at the National Theatre in 2013, for which she was nominated for an Olivier Award as well as winning an Evening Standard Award. She has also had leading parts in City of Angels (Donmar Warehouse), Finding Neverland (Leicester Curve) and Ragtime (Regent's Park Open Air Theatre).

She appeared in the musical London Road at the National Theatre and subsequently in Rufus Norris's film adaptation. Craig's other work with the National Theatre include: As You Like It and The Threepenny Opera. She appeared in the premiere of musical Wonder.land, at Palace Theatre, Manchester for the Manchester International Festival; also directed by Norris in association with the National Theatre. 
 
Her television work includes appearances in Spooks, Miranda, Endeavour, Lovesick, Midsomer Murders, Truth Seekers and The Queen's Gambit.

In September 2018, Craig began appearing alongside Patti LuPone in a revival of the Stephen Sondheim musical Company. She played the lead role of 'Bobbie,' reimagined for the first time as a woman.

In 2021, Craig played the brief role of the Whaletaur Shaman in Netflix's Centaurworld, released on 30 July 2021.  In 2022, she appeared in the Netflix series 1899.

She is married to the actor Hadley Fraser. On 1 November 2016, Craig gave birth to the couple's first child, named Elvie.

Theatre credits

Awards and nominations

References

External links

 

Living people
Alumni of Rose Bruford College
1981 births
Actresses from Nottinghamshire
English stage actresses
English musical theatre actresses